Robert Spiers Benjamin (17 August 1917 – 20 September 2009) was a 20th-century journalist. He was a founding member of the Overseas Press Club. Following his death, the club named an award in his memory for 'Best reporting in any medium on Latin America'.

He wrote and edited several books

 The Inside Story, about the Overseas Press Club
 The Vacation Guide
 Eye Witness
 I am an American, a symposium of radio interviews with important naturalized Americans. Commissioned by the US Immigration and Naturalization Service
 Call to Adventure: True Tales of Adventures Set Down by the Men who Actually Experienced Them, 1935, an anthology for the Adventurers' Club

As a child, he was a boy scout.

Links

 Obituary by the Overseas Press Club https://www.opcofamerica.org/news/robert-benjamin-last-founding-member-opc-dies

References 

American male journalists
The New York Times people
1917 births
20th-century American journalists
2009 deaths